Margaret Cezair-Thompson is a Jamaican writer. Author of novels The True History of Paradise and The Pirate's Daughter,   short stories, articles, and a screenplay about a female Jamaican athlete, Photo Finish, purchased by Oprah Winfrey (Harpo-Disney).  Cezair-Thompson is a professor of literature and creative writing at Wellesley College.

Early life and education 

Margaret Cezair-Thompson was born in Kingston, Jamaica, where she attended Saint Andrew's High School for Girls. As the daughter of Dudley J. Thompson, noted Jamaican QC who served as Jamaican Justice Minister and then as a diplomat, Cezair-Thompson recognizes her father's influence in her work: "My father's life has spanned almost a century of Caribbean and African history and being a lover both of history and storytelling and having a father who had so many first-hand stories of great events and people influenced me enormously." He met her mother in Manchester, England, where Cezair-Thompson's maternal grandfather, Dr. Hubert Cezair, was a West Indian doctor.

Cezair-Thompson left Jamaica to study English literature at Barnard College (where she was mentored by Marjorie Housepian Dobkin) and Columbia University. She then went on to complete her PhD at Graduate Center of the City University of New York where she wrote her dissertation on V. S. Naipaul with the help of legendary critic Alfred Kazin. Although she has lived outside Jamaica for many years, Cezair-Thompson retains strong ties to her native country. Like many characters in her novels, she was a child when Jamaica became an independent nation in 1962, and she has witnessed the country's changes. She currently lives in Massachusetts where she continues to work and write.

Literary style 

Her work has been compared to that of William Faulkner, George Lamming and Jamaica Kincaid. Among the themes in her work is the individual quest for place and identity within the tumult of history. She is not only interested in Jamaica's history but how Jamaica's history connects to history at large: "Growing up as a child in Jamaica, it never seemed as though my history was in any way connected to the great moments in European history except when it came to talking about slavery, but now I'm seeing all the ways in which [formerly marginalized] areas were very much players in world events and bigger history." She feels part of a growing tradition of post-colonial writers "very much claiming back their part in a bigger history." Many critics also praise Cezair-Thompson's ability to evoke the "genuine essence of Jamaica" in her descriptions of the Jamaican landscape, flora and culture.

The writers (and books) of special interest to Cezair-Thompson include Edith Wharton, Virginia Woolf, Thomas Hardy, Paule Marshall, Ben Okri, Jean Rhys, William Shakespeare, James Joyce (Dubliners), William Makepeace Thackeray (Vanity Fair), Joseph Conrad (Heart of Darkness), William Butler Yeats, Derek Walcott, and Wallace Stevens.

Publications and awards 

The True History of Paradise, Cezair-Thompson's first novel, follows Jean Landing on a drive across the mountains as she attempts to flee Jamaica for the United States. During the ride, she recalls memories of her own fractured past as she notes the increasingly violent confrontations between political factions of her island nation: 
"Ghosts stand on the foothills of this journey. She smells their woody ancestral breath in the land's familiar crests and undulations. She has heard them all her life, these obstinate spirits, desperate to speak, to revise the broken grammar of their exits. They speak to her, Jean Landing, born in that audient hour before daylight broke on the nation, born into the knowledge of nation and prenation, the old noises of barracks, slave quarters, and steerage mingling in her ears with the newest sounds of self-rule. On verandas, in kitchens, in the old talk, in her waking reveries and anxious dreams, she has heard their stories."
The True History of Paradise was shortlisted for the International Dublin Literary Award in 2000.

Cezair-Thompson's second novel, The Pirate's Daughter, focuses more on pre-independent Jamaica, including the years that the famous swashbuckler, Errol Flynn, lived there. The novel, which imagines an affair between the star and a beautiful local, Ida, is a coming-of-age story not only of the female protagonist but of the island itself, and it subtly explores the legacies of colonialism. As one reviewer wrote, "Jamaica feels like another character in the book." Cezair-Thompson once described her choice of subject for The Pirate's Daughter, saying, "My mother told me how women in Jamaica fainted when they saw Flynn because he was so handsome. That story amused and fascinated me as a child without my realizing why. Now I think it's something to do with the impact of two very different worlds colliding: glamorous, mesmerizing Hollywood and small Jamaica which was still a colony at the time and more susceptible to outside influence." Focusing on the transitional period of Jamaica in the 1940s and 1950s, immediately preceding independence, in which physical and psychological manifestations of a British colony still prevailed, The Pirate's Daughter won the Essence Literary Award for Fiction in 2008, People Critic's #1 Choice in 2007, and the ABA Book Sense #1 Pick for October 2007. It was also on the London Sunday Times best-seller list and a Richard & Judy summer pick.

 The Pirate's Daughter (Random House, 2008)
 "Boat Man," Blue Latitudes, Caribbean Women Writers at Home and Abroad (Seal Press, 2005) and Callaloo: Journal of African-American and African Arts & Letters 16.2 (1993)
 "Geography Lessons," Washington Post Sunday Magazine (1999)
 The True History of Paradise (Dutton/Plume, 1999)
 "Beyond the Postcolonial Novel: The 'Road' to Ben Okri's The Famished Road and its 'Abiku' Traveler," Journal of Literature 31:2 (1996)
 Photo Finish, screenplay sold to Harpo-Disney (1994)

References

External links 
 Margaret Cezair-Thompson website.
 MySpace.
 "An interview with Margaret Cezair-Thompson", BookBrowse.
 Andrea Stuart, "What might have been when a rake came ashore" (review of The Pirate's Daughter), The Independent, 23 November 2007.
 "The Pirate’s Daughter, Margaret Cezair-Thompson", Words To Mouth.
 "Seduction in Jamaica (The Pirate's Daughter)". YouTube.
 Randall Kenan, "Margaret Cezair-Thompson", Bomb 69, Fall 1999. Bombsite, The Artist's Voice since 1981.

Year of birth missing (living people)
Living people
People from Kingston, Jamaica
20th-century Jamaican novelists
21st-century Jamaican novelists
Jamaican women novelists
21st-century Jamaican women writers
20th-century Jamaican women writers